Bridgend is a village which neighbours Linlithgow, in West Lothian, Scotland. It also has a football team called Bridgend United. In 2018 it had an estimated population of 790.

Overview  
Bridgend is a small village situated just outside Linlithgow.

It also has a school for children aged 4 to 12 called Bridgend Primary School.

It has one shop called U Save, a community centre, and a golf club & 9 hole course which was built in 1999 on the site of the Bridgend Rows that was built for workers for the former Champfleurie Oil Works.

References

External links

Museum of the Scottish shale oil industry - Bridgend Rows
Bridgend Golf Course

Villages in West Lothian